The R773 road is a regional road in Ireland. The road connects Jack White's with Brittas Bay and the coast.

Route
The route begins at its junction with the M11 near Jack White's Pub. The route travels east towards Brittas Bay passing a few housing estates. The route terminates at its junction with the R750 in Brittas Bay.

See also
Roads in Ireland
National primary road
National secondary road

References
Roads Act 1993 (Classification of Regional Roads) Order 2006 – Department of Transport

Regional roads in the Republic of Ireland
Roads in County Wicklow